The Miss Mundo Dominicana 2006 pageant was held on July 10, 2006. Only 16 candidates competed for the national crown. The chosen winner represented the Dominican Republic at the Miss World 2006. The runners-up could enter different small international pageants.

Results

Special awards
 Miss Photogenic (voted by press reporters) -Tania Medina (La Romana)
 Miss Congeniality (voted by contestants) - Indhira Díaz (Dajabón)
 Best Face - Paola Torres (Santiago)
 Best Hair - Valerie Chardonnens Vargas(Santiago)
 Miss Elegancia - Zadia Núñez (Monte Plata)
 Miss Internet (voted by viewers in ) - Valerie Chardonenns Vargas (Santiago)
 Best Beach Dominican Beauty - Ana Viñas (Puerto Plata)

Miss Dominican Regions

Miss Exterior - Cristal de Moya (Com. Dom. Miami)
Miss Region del Cibao - Paola Torres (Santiago)
Miss Region del Sur - Tania Medina (La Romana)

Delegates

Trivia
Sandra Tavares, Miss Com. Dom. Nueva Jersey would enter Reina Nacional de Belleza Miss República Dominicana 2007.
Yamilka Santana, Miss Com. Dom. Nueva York entered Reina Nacional de Belleza Miss República Dominicana 2006.
Tania Medina, Miss La Romana and the winner Paola Torres, Miss Santiago entered Miss Dominican Republic 2006.
Ana Viñas, Miss Puerto Plata would enter Reina Nacional de Belleza Miss República Dominicana 2007 and winn to go to Miss International 2007 and she would also participate in Miss Dominican Republic 2009.
Alexandra Díaz, Miss Santo Domingo would enter Reina Nacional de Belleza Miss República Dominicana 2008 and become 2nd Runner-up to enter Miss Atlantico International and win the pageant.

External links
Miss Mundo Dominicana Official Website
Resultados de Miss Mundo Dominicana 2006
Paola Torres foto gallery
Diario Libre

Miss Dominican Republic
2006 beauty pageants
2006 in the Dominican Republic